Eric Kaplan is an American television writer and producer. His work has included shows such as Late Show with David Letterman, Andy Richter Controls the Universe, Malcolm in the Middle, Futurama, The Simpsons and Rick and Morty. He also worked on The Big Bang Theory throughout its run.

Early life
Kaplan was raised in a Jewish family in Flatbush, Brooklyn where his father was a "storefront lawyer" and his mother taught high school biology at Erasmus Hall.  Kaplan graduated from Hunter College High School and Harvard College (where he wrote for the Harvard Lampoon) in 1989.  Prior to committing to a career in professional writing, Kaplan had been an English teacher in Thailand. After that he took five years of philosophy graduate school at Columbia and UC Berkeley.

Starting in 1986, Kaplan interned for Spy magazine, where his duties included mopping the floors and writing blurb-length film reviews.

Career in television
Eric Kaplan's first television writing job was with Late Show with David Letterman which he worked on for a year and a half before quitting and moving to Hollywood to look for a job in "half-hour" work. It was at this time that Kaplan learned of Matt Groening doing a show set in the year 3000. This show would turn out to be Futurama. After applying for work on the show using some writing samples, Eric would have to, as he says, "sweat it out", for over a month before getting the job. Upon Futurama's cancellation, Kaplan went to work for the short-lived comedy series Andy Richter Controls the Universe, writing just one episode. After Fox dropped Andy Richter, Eric Kaplan then began work on the hit show Malcolm in the Middle, Eric also wrote the "Girlfriends" episode of the popular HBO series, Flight of the Conchords.

Futurama
In his first year with Futurama, which was also the show's first season, Kaplan served as story editor on every episode. Though having an input on many aspects of the entire first season, Kaplan would not get a writing credit until 9 episodes in. After this premiere season, he would be promoted to producer status. This was a role that he would keep through the show's end. He returned to those roles in the Futurama DVD movies.

Futurama episode writing credits:

 "Hell Is Other Robots"
 "Why Must I Be a Crustacean in Love?"
 "A Bicyclops Built for Two"
 "Parasites Lost"
 "I Dated a Robot"
 "Jurassic Bark"
 "Three Hundred Big Boys"

Futurama DVD movies writing credits:

 Futurama: The Beast with a Billion Backs – winner of the Annie Award for Best Animated DVD Feature
 Futurama: Bender's Game

The Simpsons
He wrote the season 24 episode "The Saga of Carl".

Malcolm in the Middle
In his two years as a writer on Malcolm in the Middle, Kaplan wrote four episodes while serving as supervising producer in the first half of the 5th season and co-executive producer throughout the rest of the series' run.

Malcolm in the Middle episode writing credits:

 "Dirty Magazine"
 "Victor's Other Family"
 "Dewey's Opera"
 "Ida's Dance"
 "Blackout"
 "Hal Grieves"

Zombie College

Zombie College was an internet web series Kaplan created that revolved around a student at a college full of zombies.

Kaplan described the premise of Zombie College as the idea of the human ability to get used to practically anything. That there's nothing so horrible that we can't get used to it and accept it as part of life (...) Zombie College is an environment where there are undead monsters running around and trying to eat your brain but everybody is o.k. with it and they're more interested in getting good grades.

The Drinky Crow Show
Kaplan  co-created The Drinky Crow Show, based on the Maakies comics  by Tony Millionaire, for Adult Swim. The pilot aired on May 17, 2007, and the series premiered in November 2008.

Flight of the Conchords
Kaplan wrote the episode "Girlfriends".

The Big Bang Theory
Kaplan is a writer and Executive Producer on The Big Bang Theory.

Mirari Films
Kaplan runs Mirari Films, an animation studio and VFX house. In addition to The Drinky Crow Show, Mirari Films has produced The Adventures of Baxter and McGuire, The Problem Solverz, King Star King and Brickleberry.

Work in Philosophy, Does Santa Exist?
Kaplan's "Does Santa Exist?: A Philosophical Investigation" was published by Dutton Books in 2015. It is a serious and humorous work of philosophy. He has also contributed to "The Stone", The New York Times philosophy blog.
Kaplan has a PhD. in philosophy from UC Berkeley. His doctoral thesis discusses the humour in Søren Kierkegaard.

Kaplan was interviewed in 2020 by lifelong friend Roger Kimmel Smith (whose father, Robert Kimmel Smith, wrote the book The War with Grandpa'', which in 2020 was adapted into a motion picture starring Robert De Niro). Their conversation about humor and philosophy was released over the YouTube channel When Humanists Attack.

References

External links
 

Living people
American television writers
Jewish American writers
American male television writers
The Harvard Lampoon alumni
Harvard College alumni
Hunter College High School alumni
University of California, Berkeley alumni
Columbia University alumni
1967 births
People from Flatbush, Brooklyn
Screenwriters from New York (state)
21st-century American Jews